George Henry Steil Sr. (March 29, 1861 – October 25, 1926) was the Mayor of Hoboken, New Jersey, from 1905 to 1909.

Biography
He was born on March 29, 1861, in Hoboken, New Jersey, to X Steil and Catherine Ducker. He married Margaret Sanderson Daniels of New Orleans in 1889. He was the Mayor of Hoboken, New Jersey, starting in 1905 when he replaced Adolph Lankering. In the 1905 election he beat Joseph Francis Xavier Stack, M.D., the Republican candidate. He served until 1909 when he was defeated in the election by George Washington Gonzales. He died on October 25, 1926. He was 65 years old.

References

External links

1861 births
1926 deaths
Mayors of Hoboken, New Jersey